"The Devil and his Grandmother" or "The Dragon and His Grandmother" is a German fairy tale collected by the Brothers Grimm, number 125. According to Jack Zipes, the source of the story was Dorothea Viehmann, the wife of a tailor from Hesse.

Andrew Lang included it in The Yellow Fairy Book.

A version of this tale also appears in A Book of Dragons by Ruth Manning-Sanders.

It is Aarne-Thompson-Uther Index type 821, the devil's riddle.

Synopsis
Three soldiers could not live on their pay, and so attempted to desert by hiding in a cornfield. When the army did not march away, they were soon caught between starving or emerging to face execution. A dragon happened to fly by at this time, however, and offered the three men salvation under the condition that they must serve him for seven years. When they agreed, the dragon, named Westerlies, carried them off. However, the dragon was in fact the Devil. He gave them a whip with which they could make money, but said at the end of seven years, they were his unless they could guess a riddle in which case they would be free and could keep the whip.

At the end of the seven years, two of the soldiers were morose at the thought of their fate. An old woman advised them to go down to a cottage for help. The third soldier, who did not fear the riddle, went down and met the devil's grandmother. She was pleased with his manners and hid him in the cellar. When the devil came, she questioned him, and the soldier learned the answers.

The Devil found them at the end of the seven years, and said he would take them to hell and serve them a meal. The riddle was: what was the meat, the silver spoon, and the wineglass for that meal. The soldiers gave the correct answers: a dead sea-cat in the North Sea, a whale rib, and an old horse's hoof. No longer in the devil's power, the soldiers lived happily ever after thanks to the money-making whip that they kept.

In popular culture
 The Devil and his Grandmother is featured in Grimm's Fairy Tale Classics under its "Grimm Masterpiece Theater" season where the story was referred to as "The Naughty Spirit." Additionally the third soldier is a drummer boy who the other two had forced to desert with them as he was the only one who knew the way back to the village they planned to flee to. Additionally the devil in this version is a gargoyle known as Beelzebub who is depicted as being a low level demon who is terrible at making riddles. The grandmother is omitted and the drummer boy learns the first two answers by spying on Beelzebub and the third he learns by praying to angels in heaven who take pity on him. Also Beelzebub's riddles are actually a goatskin made to look like silk, a billy goat made to look like a horse, and a cup of death made from the horn of a ram made to appear as a golden cup. After solving the riddles the three are returned to forest they were hiding in though the story ends with them running into the same regiment they had deserted forcing them to flee.
 The story inspired Mike Mignola's fifth issue of his series Hellboy In Hell called "The Three Gold Whips"

See also

 Bearskin
 The Devil With the Three Golden Hairs
 The Story of Three Wonderful Beggars
 The Prince and the Princess in the Forest

References

External links

 The Devil and His Grandmother 

Grimms' Fairy Tales
The Devil in fairy tales
Dragons in fairy tales
Hell in popular culture
Deal with the Devil
Literary duos
Fictional families
German fairy tales
ATU 750-849